John Houser may refer to: 

 John Houser (rower) (1909–1991), American Olympic rower
 John Houser (American football) (born 1935), American football player
 John Sherrill Houser (born 1935), American sculptor and painter 
 John Russell Houser, perpetrator of the 2015 Lafayette shooting